Lotfi Housnialaoui (born 28 May 1972) is a Moroccan alpine skier. He competed in two events at the 1988 Winter Olympics.

References

1972 births
Living people
Moroccan male alpine skiers
Olympic alpine skiers of Morocco
Alpine skiers at the 1988 Winter Olympics
Place of birth missing (living people)
20th-century Moroccan people